Sahawar is a town and a nagar panchayat, as well as Tehsil in Kasganj district in the Indian State of Uttar Pradesh. Previously, it was part of district Etah. Zahida Sultan D/O Late Malik Muhammad Mushir Ahmed Khan (Ex MP Lok sabha) is the present chairperson of Sahawar Town.
The Block Sahawar was established in 01/04/1958.

Geography
It has an average elevation of 176 metres (577 feet). Sahawar is a co-community town. 
Sahawar, Surround s 100 km away from the cities Bareilly, Mathura, Agra, Aligarh, Mainpuri and almost 250 km From National Capital New Delhi & State Capital Lucknow. It is 12 km away from Soron and 20 km from Mahabharata State Patiyali.

Demographics
 India census, Sahawar had a population of 24,457. Males constitute 53% of the population and females 47%. Sahawar has an average literacy rate of 66%, lower than the national average of 59.5%: male literacy is 42%, and female literacy is 28%. In Sahawar, 19% of the population is under 6 years of age.

References

Cities and towns in Kasganj district